Abdiaziz Mohamud Guled, also known Abdiaziz Afrika professionally as Thatjama, is a prominent Somali journalist. Born in Mogadishu, But Based in London, Guled was initially known for his work in private radio and television stations prior to joining Somali National Television and Radio around 2009. In November 2020, Guled was appointed director of the Somali federal state-run Radio Mogadishu, a position he held until his assassination in 20 November 2021.

Guled previously produced "Gungaar", a popular government-run television show on Somali National Television. The word "Gungaar" means "In-Depth" in Somali.

A hard critic of the Islamist Al-Shabaab, he was well known for his interviews with detained Al-Shabab members. His brother was murdered by the group when one of the group's terrorists blew himself up as he was leaving a restaurant in Mogadishu. The bomber directly targeted abdi and killed him at the scene. Two other people were injured in the blast, including Guled's colleague, journalist Sharmarke Warsame, who was traveling with him at the time.

References 

Date of birth unknown
Year of birth unknown
20th-century births
2021 deaths
Assassinated Somalian journalists
Somalian journalists
Somalian radio journalists
Somalian television journalists
People from Mogadishu